I'll Say She Does is a 1945 thriller novel by the British writer Peter Cheyney. It is the tenth in his series of novels featuring the FBI agent Lemmy Caution. Later editions of the book are generally titled I'll Say She Does!

Synopsis
In the wake of the Second World War, Caution is in Paris on the trail of some missing State Department files. His hunt soon takes him to Britain.

Adaptation
In 1960 it was made into the French film Women Are Like That directed by Bernard Borderie and starring Eddie Constantine, Françoise Brion and Alfred Adam.

References

Bibliography
 Goble, Alan. The Complete Index to Literary Sources in Film. Walter de Gruyter, 1999.
 James, Russell. Great British Fictional Detectives. Remember When, 21 Apr 2009.
 Reilly, John M. Twentieth Century Crime & Mystery Writers. Springer, 2015.
 Panek, LeRoy. The Special Branch: The British Spy Novel, 1890-1980. Popular Press, 1981.
 Pitts, Michael R. Famous Movie Detectives. Scarecrow Press, 1979.

1945 British novels
Novels by Peter Cheyney
British thriller novels
Novels set in London
Novels set in Paris
British crime novels
British novels adapted into films
William Collins, Sons books